Lincoln Christian University (LCU) is a private Christian university in Lincoln, Illinois. It maintains extension sites in Normal, Illinois, metropolitan Indianapolis, Indiana, and Las Vegas, Nevada. LCU is affiliated with the Christian churches and churches of Christ.

LCU provides four year, co-educational, Bible college offerings including Bachelor's degrees. LCU's graduate seminary offers Master's degrees (including a Master of Divinity). The university also offers continuing educational programs at its various sites and online.

History
LCU was founded in 1944 as Lincoln Bible Institute, a four-year Bible college aligned with the Restoration Movement. Its first president was Earl Hargrove and its first dean was Enos Dowling. The seminary opened in 1951.

In 1993, LCU became affiliated with Eastern Christian College, which was renamed Lincoln Christian College-East Coast.  ECC then closed in 2005 and was absorbed by Mid-Atlantic Christian University.

LCU's most recent construction projects were new athletics facilities in 2006 and new housing in 2007 with ongoing renovation of office and classroom buildings.

In May 2009, officials from then-LCCS announced that the institution would change its name to Lincoln Christian University, effective September 2009.

Athletics
At the time of the school's cancellation of the athletic program, Lincoln Christian athletic teams were known as the Red Lions. The university was a member of the National Association of Intercollegiate Athletics (NAIA) as an NAIA Independent within the Continental Athletic Conference from 2014–15 to 2021–22. They were also a member of the National Christian College Athletic Association (NCCAA), primarily competing as an independent in the North Central Region of the Division I level. The Red Lions previously competed as a member of the NCAA Division III ranks, primarily competing in the St. Louis Intercollegiate Athletic Conference (SLIAC) from 2006–07 to the 2007 fall season (2007–08 school year).

Lincoln Christian competed in seven intercollegiate varsity sports: Men's sports included baseball, basketball and soccer; while women's sports included basketball, soccer and volleyball; and co-ed sports included eSports.

The university discontinued varsity athletics program at the end of the 2022 spring season (2021–22 school year).

References

External links 
 Official website
 Official athletics website 

 
Lincoln, Illinois
Association for Biblical Higher Education
Universities and colleges affiliated with the Christian churches and churches of Christ
Education in Logan County, Illinois
Buildings and structures in Logan County, Illinois
1944 establishments in Illinois
Private universities and colleges in Illinois